Chen Sensen (born 10 May 1996) is a Chinese rower.

He won a medal at the 2019 World Rowing Championships.

References

External links

1996 births
Living people
Chinese male rowers
World Rowing Championships medalists for China
Asian Games medalists in rowing
Rowers at the 2018 Asian Games
Asian Games silver medalists for China
Medalists at the 2018 Asian Games